Halfbird is the third album by Deerhoof. It was released by Menlo Park Records in 2001.

Composition
Halfbird works in "bluesy, punked-out" garage rock.

Track listing
 "Halfrabbit Halfdog" – 2:32
 "Six Holes on a Stick" – 2:03
 "Red Dragon" – 3:13
 "Trickybird" – 3:05
 "The Man, the King, the Girl and the Spider" – 2:08
 "Witchery Glamour Spell" – 1:05
 "Queen Orca Wicca Wind" – 2:44
 "Sunnyside" – 2:02
 "Carriage" – 3:25
 "Littleness" – 2:45
 "Xmas Tree" – 2:31
 "Rat Attack" – 1:45
 "The Forty Fours" – 1:10
 "Halfmole Halfbird" – 4:40

Personnel
 Rob Fisk – guitar
 Satomi Matsuzaki – vocals and bass guitar
 Greg Saunier – drums, guitar and vocals

References

2001 albums
Deerhoof albums